A list of films produced in South Korea in 1975:

References

External links
1975 in South Korea

 1970-1979 at www.koreanfilm.org

1975
South Korean
Films